Halblech is a river of Bavaria, Germany. It flows into the Lech near Prem.

See also
List of rivers of Bavaria

References

Rivers of Bavaria
Ammergau Alps
Ostallgäu
Rivers of Germany